Offer or offers may refer to:

People
 Ofer Eshed or Offer Eshed (1942-2007), Israeli basketball player
 Offer Nissim (born 1964), Israeli house DJ
 Avner Offer, economic historian
 Dick Offer, English rower
 Jack Offer, English rower
 Steve Offer (born 1949), former Canadian politician
 Vince Offer (born 1964), Israeli-born American spokesperson

Brands and enterprises
 Google Offers, was a service offering discounts and coupons
 Offers.com, an online marketplace

Business terms
 Proposal (business), a written offer from a seller to a prospective buyer
 Offer price, the price a seller is willing to accept for a particular good
 Tender offer, an offer to buy company stock from existing stockholders under specific conditions

Law
 Firm offer, an offer that is irrevocable for a certain period or until a certain time or occurrence of a certain event
 Offer and acceptance, elements of a contract
 Offer of judgment, a United States tort reform law aimed at controlling unnecessary litigation and at encouraging settlement
 Settlement offer, an offer to end a civil lawsuit out of court

Other uses
 Offers, a 2005 Dutch television film
 Office of Electricity Regulation (OFFER), a forerunner of the current Office of Gas and Electricity Markets in Great Britain

See also 
 Offering (disambiguation)